Francette Vernillat (16 April 1937 – 2 December 2019) was a French actress. She was often a voice actor for characters playing young boys.

Filmography
Autant en emporte le vent (1939)
L'ombre d'un doute (1943)
Monsieur Vincent (1947)
Le destin exécrable de Guillemette Babin (1948)
 Je n'ai que toi au monde (1949)
Le droit de l'enfant (1949)
Doctor Laennec (1949)
Ronde de nuit (1949)
 Maria of the End of the World (1951)
Les Sept Péchés capitaux (1952)
Thérèse Raquin (1953)
Une balle signée X (1959)
Le Mystère des treize (1966)
Au-delà du réel (1980)
The Karate Kid (1984)
D.A.R.Y.L. (1985)
Les Enfants du silence (1986)

Theatre
Le Square du Pérou (1948)
 Le Moulin de la galette (1951)
Le Bonheur des méchants (1952)
Les Sorcières de Salem (1954)
Amour, contact et court-circuit (1960)

References

French actresses
1937 births
2019 deaths